Soil fertility refers to the ability of soil to sustain agricultural plant growth, i.e. to provide plant habitat and result in sustained and consistent yields of high quality. It also refers to the soil's ability to supply plant/crop nutrients in the right quantities and qualities over a sustained period of time.A fertile soil has the following properties:
 The ability to supply essential plant nutrients and water in adequate amounts and proportions for plant growth and reproduction; and
 The absence of toxic substances which may inhibit plant growth e.g Fe2+ which leads to nutrient toxicity.

The following properties contribute to soil fertility in most situations:
 Sufficient soil depth for adequate root growth and water retention;
 Good internal drainage, allowing sufficient aeration for optimal root growth (although some plants, such as rice, tolerate waterlogging);
 Topsoil  or horizon O is with sufficient soil organic matter for healthy soil structure and soil moisture retention;
 Soil pH in the range 5.5 to 7.0 (suitable for most plants but some prefer or tolerate more acid or alkaline conditions);
 Adequate concentrations of essential plant nutrients in plant-available forms;
 Presence of a range of microorganisms that support plant growth.

In lands used for agriculture and other human activities, maintenance of soil fertility typically requires the use of soil conservation practices. This is because soil erosion and other forms of soil degradation generally result in a decline in quality with respect to one or more of the aspects indicated above.

Soil fertilization

Bioavailable phosphorus (available to soil life) is the element in soil that is most often lacking. Nitrogen and potassium are also needed in substantial amounts. For this reason these three elements are always identified on a commercial fertilizer analysis. For example, a 10-10-15 fertilizer has 10 percent nitrogen, 10 percent available phosphorus (P2O5) and 15 percent water-soluble potassium (K2O). Sulfur is the fourth element that may be identified in a commercial analysis—e.g. 21-0-0-24 which would contain 21% nitrogen and 24% sulfate.

Inorganic fertilizers are generally less expensive and have higher concentrations of nutrients than organic fertilizers. Also, since nitrogen, phosphorus and potassium generally must be in the inorganic forms to be taken up by plants, inorganic fertilizers are generally immediately bioavailable to plants without modification.  However, some have criticized the use of inorganic fertilizers, claiming that the water-soluble nitrogen doesn't provide for the long-term needs of the plant and creates water pollution. Slow-release fertilizers may reduce leaching loss of nutrients and may make the nutrients that they provide available over a longer period of time.

Soil fertility is a complex process that involves the constant cycling of nutrients between organic and inorganic forms. As plant material and animal wastes are decomposed by micro-organisms, they release inorganic nutrients to the soil solution, a process referred to as mineralization. Those nutrients may then undergo further transformations which may be aided or enabled by soil micro-organisms. Like plants, many micro-organisms require or preferentially use inorganic forms of nitrogen, phosphorus or potassium and will compete with plants for these nutrients, tying up the nutrients in microbial biomass, a process often called immobilization. The balance between immobilization and mineralization processes depends on the balance and availability of major nutrients and organic carbon to soil microorganisms. Natural processes such as lightning strikes may fix atmospheric nitrogen by converting it to (NO2). Denitrification may occur under anaerobic conditions (flooding) in the presence of denitrifying bacteria. Nutrient cations, including potassium and many micronutrients, are held in relatively strong bonds with the negatively charged portions of the soil in a process known as cation exchange.

In 2008 the cost of phosphorus as fertilizer more than doubled, while the price of rock phosphate as base commodity rose eight-fold. Recently the term peak phosphorus has been coined, due to the limited occurrence of rock phosphate in the world.

A wide variety of materials have been described as soil conditioners due to their ability to improve soil quality, including biochar, offering multiple soil health benefits.

Light and CO2 limitations

Photosynthesis is the process whereby plants use light energy to drive chemical reactions which convert CO2 into sugars. As such, all plants require access to both light and carbon dioxide to produce energy, grow and reproduce.

While typically limited by nitrogen, phosphorus and potassium, low levels of carbon dioxide can also act as a limiting factor on plant growth. Peer-reviewed and published scientific studies have shown that increasing CO2 is highly effective at promoting plant growth up to levels over 300 ppm. Further increases in co2 can, to a very small degree, continue to increase net photosynthetic output.

Soil depletion
Soil depletion occurs when the components which contribute to fertility are removed and not replaced, and the conditions which support soil's fertility are not maintained. This leads to poor crop yields. In agriculture, depletion can be due to excessively intense cultivation and inadequate soil management.

Soil fertility can be severely challenged when land-use changes rapidly.  For example, in Colonial New England, colonists made a number of decisions that depleted the soils, including: allowing herd animals to wander freely, not replenishing soils with manure, and a sequence of events that led to erosion. William Cronon wrote that "...the long-term effect was to put those soils in jeopardy.  The removal of the forest, the increase in destructive floods, the soil compaction and close-cropping wrought by grazing animals, ploughing--all served to increase erosion."

One of the most widespread occurrences of soil depletion  is in tropical zones where nutrient content of soils is low. The combined effects of growing population densities, large-scale industrial logging, slash-and-burn agriculture and ranching, and other factors, have in some places depleted soils through rapid and almost total nutrient removal.

The depletion of soil has affected the state of plant life and crops in agriculture in many countries. In the Middle East for example, many countries find it difficult to grow produce because of droughts, lack of soil, and lack of irrigation. The Middle East has three countries that indicate a decline in crop production, the highest rates of productivity decline are found in hilly and dryland areas. Many countries in Africa also undergo a depletion of fertile soil. In regions of dry climate like Sudan and the countries that make up the Sahara Desert, droughts and soil degradation is common. Cash crops such as teas, maize, and beans require a variety of nutrients in order to grow healthy. Soil fertility has declined in the farming regions of Africa and the use of artificial and natural fertilizers has been used to regain the nutrients of ground soil.

Topsoil depletion occurs when the nutrient-rich organic topsoil, which takes hundreds to thousands of years to build up under natural conditions, is eroded or depleted of its original organic material. Historically, many past civilizations' collapses can be attributed to the depletion of the topsoil. Since the beginning of agricultural production in the Great Plains of North America in the 1880s, about one-half of its topsoil has disappeared.

Depletion may occur through a variety of other effects, including overtillage (which damages soil structure), underuse of nutrient inputs which leads to mining of the soil nutrient bank, and salinization of soil.

Irrigation effects
The quality of irrigation water is very important to maintain soil fertility and tilth, and for using more soil depth by the plants. When soil is irrigated with high alkaline water, unwanted sodium salts build up in the soil which would make soil draining capacity very poor. So plant roots can not penetrate deep into the soil for optimum growth in Alkali soils. When soil is irrigated with low pH / acidic water, the useful salts ( Ca, Mg, K, P, S, etc.) are removed by draining water from the acidic soil and in addition unwanted aluminium and manganese salts to the plants are dissolved from the soil impeding plant growth.  When soil is irrigated with high salinity water or sufficient water is not draining out from the irrigated soil, the soil would convert into saline soil or lose its fertility. Saline water enhance the turgor pressure or osmotic pressure requirement which impedes the off take of water and nutrients by the plant roots.

Top soil loss takes place in alkali soils due to erosion by rain water surface flows or drainage as they form colloids (fine mud) in contact with water. Plants absorb water-soluble inorganic salts only from the soil for their growth. Soil as such does not lose fertility just by growing crops but it lose its fertility due to accumulation of unwanted and depletion of wanted inorganic salts from the soil by improper irrigation and acid rain water (quantity and quality of water). The fertility of many soils which are not suitable for plant growth can be enhanced many times gradually by providing adequate irrigation water of suitable quality and good drainage from the soil.

Global distribution

See also
 Arable land
 Plaggen soil
 Shifting cultivation
 Soil contamination
 Soil life
 Terra preta
 Cation-exchange capacity

References

Soil
Soil improvers
Fertilizers
Horticulture